Kane Spring (formerly, Cane Spring, Kane Springs, and San Anselmo) is a spring in Imperial County, California.
It is located 1.9 km (1.2 mi) south-southwest of San Felipe Wash and 8 km (5 mi) west of the southwestern extension of the Salton Sea, at an elevation of 141 feet (43 m) below sea level.

In 1774, the Anza Expedition stopped at Kane Spring (called San Anselmo).

References

Reference bibliography 

Unincorporated communities in Imperial County, California
Unincorporated communities in California